Mount Martin is a stratovolcano, located on the Alaska Peninsula, United States, in Katmai National Park and Preserve. It is one of the volcanoes in the vicinity of the Valley of Ten Thousand Smokes. Mount Martin's cone stands only about  higher than the surrounding ridge. Although an eruption in 1953 is now considered questionable and no other confirmed eruptive activity has taken place at Mount Martin, there is intense fumarolic activity within its summit crater. The summit crater is also breached to the southeast. The 300 m (984 ft)-wide summit crater is often ice-free due to the geothermal heat and contains an intermittent acidic crater lake. The fumaroles in the summit crater produce extensive sulfur deposits. 

Mount Martin is relatively young, perched on a ridge and partly overlaying deposits from nearby Alagogshak volcanic edifice.

The volcano is named for George C. Martin, who was the first person to visit the Valley of Ten Thousand Smokes after the 1912 eruption of Novarupta.

See also
 List of volcanoes in the United States of America

References

External links
 Mount Martin at the Alaska Volcano Observtory
 

Stratovolcanoes of the United States
Active volcanoes
Mountains of Alaska
Volcanoes of Alaska
Volcanic crater lakes
Volcanoes of Lake and Peninsula Borough, Alaska
Mountains of Lake and Peninsula Borough, Alaska
Aleutian Range
Katmai National Park and Preserve
Holocene stratovolcanoes